The Vardar Banovina, or Vardar Banate, was a province (banate) of the Kingdom of Yugoslavia between 1929 and 1941.

History
It was located in the southernmost part of the country, encompassing the whole of today's North Macedonia, southern parts of Southern and Eastern Serbia and southeastern parts of Kosovo and Serbia. It was named after the Vardar River and its administrative capital was the city of Skopje. Following the First World War in Vardar Macedonia and the so called Western Outlands, the local Bulgarian/Macedonian population was not recognized and state-policy of Serbianisation occurred. It also suffered the worst health problems, especially typhus and smallpox, and required one Institute of Hygiene, 3 health stations and 6 dispensaries and convalescent homes. On the other hand, unlike the banovinas that until the creation of Yugoslavia had belonged to the Austro-Hungarian empire and the lands of Montenegro, it had inherited no debts. According to the 1931 Constitution of the Kingdom of Yugoslavia, the Vardar Banovina was bounded on the north by the boundaries of the Zeta and Morava Banovinas, and on the east, south and west by the State frontiers with Bulgaria, Greece, and Albania. In 1941, the World War II Axis Powers occupied the Vardar Banovina and divided it between Bulgaria, German-occupied Serbia, and Albania under Italy. Following World War II, the southern portion of the region became Socialist Republic of Macedonia while the northern portions were made a part of the Socialist Republic of Serbia, both within the Socialist Federal Republic of Yugoslavia.

Bans of Vardar Banovina
Živojin Lazić (1929–1932)
Dobrica Matković (1932–1933)
Dragoslav Đorđević (1933–1935)
Ranko Trifunović (1935–1936)
Dušan Filipović (1936)
Dragan Paunović (1936–1937)
Marko Novaković (1937–1939)
Vladimir Hajduk-Veljković (1939)
Aleksandar Cvetković (1939)
Aleksandar Andrejević (1939–1940)
Žika Rafajlović (1940–1941)

Cities and towns

Skopje (capital)
Berovo
Bitola
Bosilegrad
Delčevo
Debar
Dragaš
Gevgelija
Gjilan
Gostivar
Makedonski Brod
Kaçanik
Kavadarci
Kičevo
Kočani
Kratovo
Kriva Palanka
Kruševo
Kumanovo
Lebane
Leskovac
Negotino
Ohrid
Preševo
Prilep
Pristina
Prizren
Radoviš
Resen
Rostuša
Strumica
Surdulica
Suva Reka
Sveti Nikola
Štip
Tetovo
Ferizaj
Valandovo
Veles
Vladičin Han
Vranje

See also

Kingdom of Yugoslavia
Vardar Macedonia

References

External links

The Constitution of the Kingdom of Yugoslavia

Yugoslav Macedonia
Yugoslav Serbia
History of Kosovo
Banovinas of the Kingdom of Yugoslavia
1929 establishments in Yugoslavia
1941 disestablishments in Yugoslavia
Vardar Macedonia (1918–1941)
States and territories established in 1929